Viktor Bánky (17 January 1899 – 13 March 1967) was a Hungarian film editor and director.

Selected filmography
Editor
 A Night in Venice (1934)
 Where the Lark Sings (1936)
 Fräulein Veronika (1936)
 Sein letztes Modell (1937)
 Young Noszty and Mary Toth (1938)
 Borcsa Amerikában (1938)
 Magda Expelled (1938)

Director
 The Minister's Friend (1939)
 Istvan Bors (1939)
 András (1941)
 Dr. Kovács István (1942)
 Changing the Guard (1942)
 Makacs Kata (1943)

Bibliography
 Cunningham, John. Hungarian Cinema: From Coffee House to Multiplex. Wallflower Press, 2004.

External links

1899 births
1967 deaths
Hungarian film directors
Hungarian film editors
People from Tolna County